China Television Artists Association, aka China TV Artists Association, or CTAA, is a subordinate of the China Federation of Literary and Art Circles (CFLAC). It was founded in May 1985. So far it has more than 6,000 registered members, with branch associations across the nation.

Major officials
 Chairman: Zhao Huayong
 Vice-Chairman: Wan Ke, Ma Weigan, Li Xingguo, Li Jingsheng, Zhang Xian, Chen Hua, Ouyang Changlin, Zhou Li, Zhao Duojia, Hu Mei, Hu En, Tang Guoqiang, Cheng Weidong, Qiu Xin
 Secretary-General: Zhang Xian
 Deputy Secretary-General: Zhang Yanmin

List of Chairman

Award
 China TV Golden Eagle Award, established in 1983. The award is presented by the China Television Artists Association.
 The Actors of China Awards, established in 2014. The award is presented by the China Television Artists Association.

Academic journal
Current TV was its official journal.

References

1985 establishments in China
Arts organizations based in China
Arts organizations established in 1985
Television in China